Dyenmonus is a genus of longhorn beetles of the subfamily Lamiinae, containing the following species:

subgenus Angoladyenmonus
 Dyenmonus angolanus Breuning, 1956

subgenus Confusodyenmonus
 Dyenmonus confusus Aurivillius, 1908

subgenus Cylindrodyenmonus
 Dyenmonus cristipennis Breuning, 1950
 Dyenmonus cylindricus Jordan, 1894
 Dyenmonus cylindroides Breuning, 1956

subgenus Dyenmonus
 Dyenmonus nuptus Thomson, 1868

subgenus Maculodyenmonus
 Dyenmonus bimaculicollis Breuning, 1956

subgenus Pseudodyenmonus
 Dyenmonus fissilis Aurivillius, 1913

subgenus Vittatodyenmonus
 Dyenmonus nigrifrons Aurivillius, 1914
 Dyenmonus trivittatus Aurivillius, 1914

References

Saperdini